The 2007 Virginia Tech Hokies football team represented Virginia Polytechnic Institute and State University during the 2007 NCAA Division I FBS football season. The team's head coach was Frank Beamer.

The Hokies entered the season returning nine starters on offense and eight on defense, including All-American cornerback Brandon Flowers, from a 2006 team that went 10-3 and finished second in the ACC's Coastal Division behind Georgia Tech.

After the Virginia Tech massacre claimed the lives of 32 students and faculty members on Monday, April 16, 2007, the remainder of spring practice was canceled.  The Hokies had been scheduled to hold two more practices in addition to a spring game on Saturday.  As a special tribute, ESPN's College GameDay program broadcast from Blacksburg for the Hokies' opening game against East Carolina.

Schedule

Rankings

Personnel

Coaching staff

Roster

Recruiting
National Signing Day was on 2007-02-07.  The Hokies' recruiting class was highlighted by Tyrod Taylor, who was rated the #1 dual threat quarterback in the country.  Taylor was announced as the Hokies' #2 quarterback on August 21.

Below is a list of the recruits that signed their letter of intent with Virginia Tech:

Post-season awards

Following the Hokies' victory over Virginia, which clinched the division title, Xavier Adibi, Chris Ellis, Victor Harris, and Eddie Royal were honored as first team all-ACC, while Barry Booker, Duane Brown and Brandon Flowers were recognized on the second team.

References

External links

Virginia Tech
Virginia Tech Hokies football seasons
Atlantic Coast Conference football champion seasons
Virginia Tech Hokies football